Vulcano is the southernmost of the eight Aeolian Islands in the Mediterranean Sea.

Vulcano may also refer to:
Vulcano, an Italian-language motion picture from 1950.
Vulcano (band)
"Vulcano", song  by Italian singer Mina from 20 successi di Mina 1964.
Vulcano (song), Francesca Michielin 2017
Sal Vulcano
 SMS Vulcano
Drag Vulcano